The Sapulpa Sappers was a primary name of the minor league baseball teams based in Sapulpa, Oklahoma. Between 1909 and 1923, Sapulpa teams played as members of the Western Association from 1909 to 1911, Southwestern League in 1921, Southwestern Association in 1922 and Southwestern League in 1923, capturing the 1922 league championship.

History
Minor league baseball began in Sapulpa, Oklahoma in 1909. On July, 18, 1909, the Webb City Webfeet of the Class C level Western Association moved from Webb City, Missouri to Sapulpa, playing the remainder of the 1909 season as the Sapulpa Oilers. Sapulpa played home games at Athletic Park. Overall, the Webb City/Sapulpa team placed 5th in the eight–team Western Association. Their overall record was 64–59, playing under managers Perry Parker and Frank Everhart and finishing 16.5 games behind the 1st place Enid Railroaders in the final standings.

Continuing play as members of the 1910 Western Association, Sapulpa placed 3rd in the final standings. The Oilers ended the 1910 season with a 65–61 record in the final standings, 26.0 games behind the 1st place Joplin Miners in the eight–team league. The Oilers' manager was Larry Millton.

In 1911, the Class D level Western Association folded during the season. On June 18, 1911, the Sapulpa Oilers were 23–21 and in 3rd place when the league disbanded. Six Western Association teams had folded, causing the league to disband. The Sapulpa Oilers were managed by George McAvoy and Harry Bradbury in 1911, as the team ended play 6.5 games behind the 1st place Ft. Scott Scouts.

The Sapulpa Sappers franchise became a charter member of the 1921 Class D level Southwestern League. Playing at League Park, Sapulpa finished with a 68–76 record, placing 5th in the 1921 Southwestern League under managers Jerry Jones and Larry Quigley. The 1921 charter member standings featured the Bartlesville Braves (64–80), Coffeyville Refiners (71–72), Independence Producers (103–38), Miami Indians (59–84), Muskogee Mets (93–56), Parsons Parsons/Cushing Oilers (34–110), Pittsburg Pirates (87–63) and the Sapulpa Sappers (68–76). Sapulpa finished 41.5 games behind of the 1st place Independence Producers, who were 19.0 games ahead of the 2nd place Muskogee Mets.

In 1922, the Southwestern League continued play as a Class C level league. The 1922 league is also referred to as the Southwestern Association. The Sapulpa Sappers captured the 1922 Southwestern Association Championship. Playing under Manager Barney Cleveland, Sapulpa finished with a regular season record 81–58, placing 3rd overall, 4.0 games behind the Muskogee Mets in the eight–team league. In the 1922 Playoffs, Sapulpa defeated the Muskogee Mets 4 games to 2 to claim the 1922 Southwestern Association Championship.

The 1923 season was Sapulpa's final minor league season. Playing in the 1923 Class C level Southwestern League, the Sapulpa Yankees finished 2nd overall in the Southwestern League standings. The Sapulpa Yankees ended the season with a record of 76–55 under manager Barney Cleveland, finishing 6.5 games behind the 1st place Hutchinson Wheat Shockers. After the season, the Southwestern League returned only three of the eight franchises in 1924, adding five new franchises to the 1924 league.

Sapulpa, Oklahoma has not hosted another minor league team.

The ballparks
From 1909 to 1911, the Sapulpa Oilers played home games at Athletic Park. The ballpark was reportedly built in 1905.

The Sapulpa minor league teams from 1921 to 1923 hosted home games at League Park. League Park was located at the intersection of West Taft Avenue & South Hickory Street, Sapulpa, Oklahoma.

Timeline

Season–by–season

Notable alumni

Uke Clanton (1921)
Dick Crutcher (1909)
Denver Grigsby (1921-1922)
George McAvoy (1910) (1911,MGR)
George Milstead (1923)
Larry Milton (1910, MGR)
Skinny O'Neal (1923)

See also
Sapulpa Oilers playersSapulpa Yanks players

References

External link
Baseball Reference

Defunct minor league baseball teams
Sports teams in Oklahoma
Baseball teams established in 1921
Baseball teams disestablished in 1922
1921 establishments in Oklahoma
Defunct baseball teams in the United States
Defunct baseball teams in Oklahoma
Professional baseball teams in Oklahoma
Creek County, Oklahoma
Tulsa County, Oklahoma
Defunct Southwestern League teams